The heats for the women's 200 m freestyle race at the 2009 World Championships took place in the morning and evening of 28 July and the final took place in the evening session of 29 July at the Foro Italico in Rome, Italy.

Records

The following records were established during the competition:

Results

Heats

Semifinals

Final

See also
Swimming at the 2007 World Aquatics Championships – Women's 200 metre freestyle
Swimming at the 2008 Summer Olympics – Women's 200 metre freestyle

References
2009 Worlds results: Women's 200m Free Prelims from OmegaTiming.com (official timer of the 2009 Worlds); retrieved 2009-07-28.
2009 Worlds results: Women's 200m Free Semifinals from OmegaTiming.com (official timer of the 2009 Worlds); retrieved 2009-07-28.
Finals Results

Freestyle Women's 200 m
2009 in women's swimming